Pizza Kittens is a children's picture book by Charlotte Voake, published in 2002. It won the Nestlé Smarties Book Prize Silver Award.

References

2002 children's books
Walker Books books